Sulekha Narayan Kumbhare (born 1962) is an Indian politician, lawyer and Ambedkarite-Buddhist activist. She is founder and president of the Bahujan Republican Ekta Manch. She served as cabinet minister from 1999 to 2014 in the Government of Maharashtra. Kumbhare was member of the Maharashtra Legislative Assembly (1999 to 2004) from the Kamthi constituency in Nagpur district as Republican Party of India. She is a member of the National Commission for Minorities. She is an Ambedkarite, and spends the rest of her life in propagating Buddhism.

References 

1962 births
Republican Party of India politicians
Living people
21st-century Indian politicians
Indian Buddhists
20th-century Buddhists
21st-century Buddhists
Buddhist activists
21st-century Indian lawyers
20th-century Indian lawyers
People from Nagpur district
State cabinet ministers of Maharashtra
Maharashtra MLAs 1995–1999
Marathi politicians
21st-century Indian women politicians
Women members of the Maharashtra Legislative Assembly